Madeirovitrina is a genus of air-breathing land snails, terrestrial pulmonate gastropod mollusks in the family Vitrinidae.

Species
 Madeirovitrina albopalliata (Groh & Hemmen, 1986)
 Madeirovitrina behnii (R. T. Lowe, 1852)
 † Madeirovitrina crassa (Groh & Hemmen, 1986) 
 Madeirovitrina marcida (A. A. Gould, 1846)
 Madeirovitrina media (R. T. Lowe, 1855)
 Madeirovitrina nitida (A. Gould, 1846)
 † Madeirovitrina portosantana (Groh & Hemmen, 1986) 
 Madeirovitrina ruivensis (A. A. Gould, 1846)

References

 Groh, K. & Hemmen, J. (1986). Zur Kenntnis der Vitriniden des Madeira-Archipels (Pulmonata: Vitrinidae). Archiv für Molluskenkunde, 116 [1985] (4/6): 183–217. Frankfurt am Main.
 Bank, R. A. (2017). Classification of the Recent terrestrial Gastropoda of the World. Last update: July 16, 2017

Vitrinidae